Darr (also Cayote, Coyote) is an unincorporated community in Dawson County, Nebraska, United States. Darr is located on U.S. Route 30 and Nebraska Highway 21 between Cozad and Lexington. Darr appears on the Cozad USGS map.

History
A post office was established at Darr in 1902, and remained in operation until it was discontinued in 1923. The community was named for George B. Darr, the original owner of the town site.

References

Unincorporated communities in Dawson County, Nebraska
Unincorporated communities in Nebraska